Sutomišćica  is a village in Croatia, on the eastern side of the island of Ugljan. It is situated in a beautiful bay, about 3 km from Preko. On the opposite side of the bay a new marina has been built.

The church of St. Eufemia in Sutomišćica is first mentioned in the beginning of the 14th century, while the church of St. Grgur was built in the 12th century.

Sutomišćica is also known for the baroque villa 'Lantana' from 1686.

Populated places in Zadar County
Ugljan